Peter Foott (born September 29, 1976) is an Irish director, producer and screenwriter known for his work on The Young Offenders.

Career
Foott is one of the co-founders of Vico Films which was formed in 2004. His first short was Just a Little Bit of Love: A Tribute to Des Smyth.

Another short, The Carpenter and His Clumsy Wife was screened on RTÉ, and at a number of film festivals. It won nine awards including 'Best Comedy' at the 2004 Los Angeles Film Festival and a 'Special Mention' at the 2004 Venice Film Festival.

Subsequently, Foott worked primarily in television and comedy, including in directing and producing roles on the RTÉ comedy show Republic of Telly. Foott also won an IFTA in 2010 for 'Best TV Moment’, for directing and producing the Rubberbandits Horse Outside music video. He has also created and produced the hidden camera show The Fear.

In 2016 Foott wrote, directed and produced The Young Offenders, a story inspired by a multi-million cocaine haul off the coast of Cork during 2007. The film was released in September 2016, and had its Irish premiere at the Galway Film Fleadh 2016. The Young Offenders had the biggest opening weekend at the Irish box office of any Irish film in 2016. Its international premiere was held at Fantastic Fest in Austin Texas 2016, and its European premiere was at the BFI London Film Festival in 2016.

Early and family life
Peter Foott, of Monkstown, County Cork, attended Ashton Secondary School and later St. John's Central College in Cork city. He is married to actress Hilary Rose.

Filmography
Foott's film and TV credits include:
 The Young Offenders - TV series (2018–present)
 The Young Offenders - film (2016)
 The Doner (2014)
 The Fear (2012)
 Horse Outside (2010)
 The Republic of Telly (2009–2011)
 An Créatúr (2007)
 The Lump (2005)
 The Carpenter and His Clumsy Wife (2004)
 Just a Little Bit of Love: A Tribute to Des Smyth (2002)

Awards

References

External links

1976 births
Living people
Irish film directors
Irish film producers